Wagner e Venezia is a live album by pianist Uri Caine's Ensemble featuring compositions by Richard Wagner recorded in Venice and released on the Winter & Winter label in 1997.

Reception

In his review for Allmusic, Stephen Cook said " For the most part, the music moves at a lithe pace, matching the festive sounds of the crowd with exuberant and playful performances. Maybe not the right fit for classical purists, but certainly a fine offering for the adventurous listener".
Writing for All About Jazz, C. Michael Bailey said "Wagner e Venezia is one of the pinnacles among pinnacles from the pianist/composer's early output".

Track listing
All compositions by Richard Wagner
 "Liebestod"  (Tristan und Isolde) - 7:59  
 "Ouvertüre" (Tannhäuser) - 10:38  
 "Ouvertüre" (Lohengrin, 3.Akt) - 3:59  
 "Prelude" (Tristan und Isolde) - 9:25  
 "Ouvertüre" (Die Meistersinger von Nürnberg) - 9:43  
 "Der Ritt der Walküren" - 4:42  
 "Ouvertüre" (Lohengrin, 1.Akt) - 8:58

Personnel
Uri Caine - piano
Dominic Cortese - accordion
Mark Feldman, Joyce Hammann - violin 
Erik Friedlander - cello 
Drew Gress - bass

References

Winter & Winter Records live albums
Uri Caine live albums
1997 live albums